Birney is a surname of Scottish origin. Notable people with the surname include:

David B. Birney (1825-1864), American Civil War Union general
David Birney (born 1939), American actor
Earle Birney (1904–1995), Canadian poet
Ewan Birney (born 1972), British biologist
Jack Birney (1928–1995), Australian politician
James G. Birney (1792–1857), abolitionist; candidate for U.S. President (Liberty Party) in 1840 and 1844
Matt Birney (born 1969), Australian politician

References

Surnames of Scottish origin